Daniel Johansen may refer to:

 Daniel Johansen (athlete) (1885 – 1967), Norwegian track and field athlete
 Daniel Johansen (footballer) (born 1998), Faroese football player

See also
Daniel Johansson (disambiguation)